The Ministry of Petroleum and Natural Resources Division ,  wazarat-e- petroleum o qudrati wasail (abbreviated as MoPNR) is a Pakistan Government's federal and executive level ministry responsible to ensure availability and security of sustainable supply of oil and gas for economic development and strategic requirements of Pakistan and to coordinate development of natural resources of energy and minerals.

The Ministry was converted into Petroleum Division in August 2017 and the division was merged into Ministry of Energy.

History of the Ministry

Petroleum & Natural Resources Division was created in April 1977. Prior to that Petroleum and Natural Resources was part of the Ministry of Fuel, Power and Natural Resources.

Wings /Sections
 Directorate General of Gas
 Directorate General of LNG & LPG
 Directorate General of Oil
 Directorate General of Petroleum Concession
 Human Resource and Administration Wing
 International Joint Venture Wing

Organizations

Geological Survey of Pakistan

The Geological Survey of Pakistan is an autonomous and independent institution under Ministry of Petroleum and Natural Resources which is tasked and mandate with advancing the geoscience knowledge and carrying out systematic studies on official mapping and area surveying.

Government Holdings Private Limited
Government Holdings Private Limited (GHPL) was registered as private limited company in 2000 under the Companies Ordinance 1984. It is 100% owned by the Government of Pakistan and operates under the Ministry of Petroleum and Natural Resources.
The purpose of creating this company was to separate the regulatory and commercial functions to efficiently manage the Government's interest in petroleum exploration and production joint ventures which was previously managed by Directorate General of Petroleum Concession.
GHPL had a mandatory 5% interest in all Exploration Licenses granted by the Government during the exploration phase which was to be carried by other joint venture partners. This working interest was to increase in case of commercial discovery from 15% to 25% depending on the discovery zone.

Oil and Gas Development Company

OGDCL is the national oil & gas company of Pakistan and the flagship of the country's exploration and production sector.

Pakistan Mineral Development Corporation

PMDC is an autonomous corporation under the administrative control of Ministry of Petroleum and Natural Resources, Government of Pakistan. It was established in 1974 to expand and help mineral development activities in the country.
It is involved in exploration and evaluation of economic mineral deposits, preparation of techno-economic feasibility reports, mining and marketing.

Pakistan Petroleum

Pakistan Petroleum Limited (Reporting name: PPL or PP)  was incorporated on June 5, 1950, when it inherited the assets and liabilities of the Burmah Oil Company Ltd.

The company is headquartered in Karachi. It operates major oil and gas fields, including the Sui gas field, has non-operating interests in other fields, and has an interest in an exploration portfolio onshore and offshore.

Inter State Gas Systems
Inter State Gas Systems (Private) Limited (ISGS) was established in 1996 as a private limited company.

In order to meet the growing energy deficit in the country, the Government of Pakistan (GOP), besides encouraging local exploration and production, plans to import natural gas from across its borders from Iran and Turkmenistan.

ISGS has been mandated by the Government to develop natural gas import projects, and to serve as an interface between the GOP and other national and international agencies for the import and storage of natural gas in Pakistan.

Saindak Metals Limited
Saindak Copper-Gold Project of Saindak Metals Limited (SML) is an organization of Ministry of Petroleum and Natural Resources, Government of Pakistan engaged in exploration processing of copper-gold, silver and allied minerals.

Lakhra Coal Development Company Limited
Lakhra Coal Development Company Limited (LCDC), was incorporated as a Public Limited Company in 1990 under Companies Ordinance 1984. The company is a joint venture of Pakistan Mineral Development Corporation (PMDC), Government of Sindh (GOS) and Water & Power Development Authority (WAPDA).

Prime objective of the company is to develop Lakhra Coal Mines to supply coal to 150 MW Thermal Plant of LPGCL (WAPDA) at Khanote which was originally planned for 6x50 MW with annual coal consumption of 15,00,000 M.Tonnes.

See also

 Energy policy of Pakistan

References

 

Petroleum and Natural Resources
Energy in Pakistan
Pakistan
Former government ministries of Pakistan